William H. Danforth (September 10, 1870 – December 24, 1955) was an American businessman known for founding Ralston Purina in St. Louis, Missouri in 1894. He was a co-founder of the American Youth Foundation (AYF) and the author of the book, I Dare You!.

Early life and education 
Danforth was raised in Charleston, Missouri. He graduated from Washington University in St. Louis.

Career
Ralston's checkerboard logo evolved from a personal development concept Danforth put forth in his book I Dare You! (1931), in which he used a checkerboard to explain it. Danforth proposed that four key components in life need to be in balance. In the illustration, "Physical" was on the left, "Mental" on top, "Social" on right and "Religious" on the bottom. To be healthy, you needed the four squares to stay in balance and one area was not to develop at expense of the other. The concept became intertwined with the company in 1921 when it began selling feed that was pressed in cubes called "checkers." The Christian Science Monitor named I Dare You! as one of the top 10 self-help books of all time.

Through the Danforth Foundation, he subsidized the construction of 24 Danforth Chapels on college campuses around the United States, and one in Japan. 
Berea College, which Danforth attended, has one of them. It is part of the Draper Building. The outer wall contains stones from Danforth's personal collection, obtained from various locations of historic importance.

Personal life 
Danforth's son was Donald Danforth, a former chief executive of the company. His grandsons include former U.S. Senator John Danforth and former Washington University chancellor William "Bill" H. Danforth.

Notes

External links
Purina profile of Danforth
William Danforth Quotes

American food company founders
American food industry business executives
Ralston Purina
1870 births
1955 deaths
Businesspeople from St. Louis
People from Charleston, Missouri
Washington University in St. Louis alumni
Berea College alumni
19th-century American businesspeople
20th-century American businesspeople